The San Remo Golden Strings were a studio group from Detroit, Michigan. A number of its members also played in the Detroit Symphony Orchestra, while others were members of the Motown backing band, The Funk Brothers. Their albums were released on Ric-Tic, Motown and Gordy labels. They scored two hits in the U.S. in 1965: "Hungry for Love" (U.S. Pop #27, U.S. AC #3) and "I'm Satisfied" (U.S. Pop  #89). In 1971, they had some success, as the "San Remo Strings"  with "Festival Time", which reached #39 in the UK Singles Chart and was popular on the UK's Northern soul music scene.

Discography

Hungry for Love (Ric-Tic, 1965) (SEPT 18 CKLG SURVEY Vancouver Canada)
Hungry for Love (Motown, 1967)
Swing (Gordy Records, 1968)
Festival Time (Tamla Motown, 1967) TMG 795
Anthology-Hungry For Love(2-Lp Set) (Gordy,1973)

References

Musical groups from Detroit
Easy listening musicians
Motown artists
Ric-Tic Records artists
Northern soul musicians
American instrumental musical groups
Musical groups established in 1965
Musical groups disestablished in 1971
1965 establishments in Michigan